Spider-Man: Homecoming (Original Motion Picture Soundtrack) is the film score to the Columbia Pictures / Marvel Studios film Spider-Man: Homecoming composed by Michael Giacchino. The soundtrack album was released by Sony Masterworks on July 7, 2017.

Background
While promoting Doctor Strange in early November 2016, Marvel Studios president Kevin Feige accidentally revealed that Michael Giacchino, who composed the music for that film, would be composing the score for Homecoming as well. Giacchino soon confirmed this himself. Recording for the soundtrack began on April 11, 2017. The score includes the theme from the 1960s cartoon series, which is played during the Marvel Studios logo. The soundtrack was released by Sony Masterworks on July 7, 2017.

Track listing
All music composed by Michael Giacchino, except where otherwise noted.

Charts

Additional music
"Blitzkrieg Bop" by the Ramones, "The Underdog" by Spoon, "Can't You Hear Me Knocking" by the Rolling Stones, "The Low Spark of High Heeled Boys" by Traffic, "Save It for Later" by The English Beat and "Space Age Love Song" by A Flock of Seagulls are also featured in the film.

References

2017 soundtrack albums
2010s film soundtrack albums
Marvel Cinematic Universe: Phase Three soundtracks
Sony Music soundtracks
Spider-Man film soundtracks
Spider-Man (2017 film series)
Michael Giacchino soundtracks